Barons is an Australian television drama series on the ABC which first screened on 24 April 2022.

Synopsis
The series parallels the story behind the Billabong and Quiksilver surf labels, in which Australian surfers in the 1970s turned their personal rivalries into professional rivalries as they built competing surfwear companies.

Cast
 Sean Keenan as Bill "Trotter" Dwyer 
 Ben O'Toole as Snapper Webster
 Jillian Nguyen as Tracy Dwyer
 Hunter Page-Lochard as Reg Thompson
 George Pullar as Bernie Hunter Jr
 Lincoln Younes as Buddy Fraser
 Sophia Forrest as Dani Kirk
 Vivienne Awosoga as Marguax Dupont
 Nicholas Burton as Tom 'Sharpie' Sharp
 Karina Banno as Jules Zemanik
 Megan MacKenzie as Kelly Fox
 Kick Gurry as Mac
 Catherine Van-Davies as Shirley Kwong
 Alexander England as Arthur Foreman
 Ione Skye as Marilyn Hunter 
 Sandy Winton as Bernie Hunter Sr
 Sebastian Tang as Dimma
 Hafedh Dakhlaoui as Carlito
 Meg Fraser as  Cindy Carroway

Episodes

Production
The eight-part series is filmed in Australia, the United States and Indonesia. It is created by Michael Lawrence and John Molloy. The writers are Liz Doran, Matt Cameron and Marieke Hardy. The series id produced by Molloy, Lawrence, Doran and Justin Davies.

References

2022 Australian television series debuts
Television shows set in South Australia
Australian Broadcasting Corporation original programming
English-language television shows